Dante Ceccatelli (14 July 1895 – 13 March 1936) was an Italian wrestler. He competed in the Greco-Roman light heavyweight event at the 1924 Summer Olympics.

References

External links
 

1895 births
1936 deaths
Olympic wrestlers of Italy
Wrestlers at the 1924 Summer Olympics
Italian male sport wrestlers
People from Prato
Sportspeople from the Province of Prato